Läti may refer to:

Läti is an Estonian name for Latvia
Läti, Rapla County, village in Vigala Parish, Rapla County, Estonia
Läti, Tartu County, village in Ülenurme Parish, Tartu County, Estonia